Charlotte McArdle is the Chief Nursing Officer for Northern Ireland. She began her nursing training at Beaumont Hospital in Dublin in 1988, qualifying in 1991. Her career has seen her work in both the Irish Republic and Northern Ireland. She was appointed as Chief Nursing Officer by the Department of Health in 2013, and has served in that role during the COVID-19 pandemic.

References

Year of birth missing (living people)
Living people
Civil servants from Northern Ireland
Nurses from Northern Ireland
NHS Chief Professional Officers